Wayne Arthur Rosenthal is a former Republican member of the Illinois House of Representatives from January 2011 until his resignation in January 2015 to head the Illinois Department of Natural Resources.

The Republican Representative Committee of the Republican Party of the 95th Representative District appointed law student Avery Bourne to the vacancy effective February 14, 2015. Wayne Rosenthal served as Director of IDNR until March 3, 2019 when he was succeeded by J.B. Pritzker appointee Colleen Callahan.

Rosenthal announced that he will run in the 2022 elections for the Illinois House of Representatives in the newly drawn 108th District. The new 108th district covers all of Menard County, and portions of Sangamon, Christian, Macoupin, and Montgomery Counties.

Rosenthal had a bachelor's degree in math from the University of Illinois Springfield. He spent his career running a family farm, and was a brigadier general in the Illinois National Guard. Prior to his election to the General Assembly he served as a trustee of Lincoln Land Community College. Rosenthal and his wife Marcia are the parents of three children.

References

External links
Representative Wayne Rosenthal (R) 95th District at the Illinois General Assembly
By session: 98th, 97th
 

Living people
Republican Party members of the Illinois House of Representatives
University of Illinois at Springfield alumni
Year of birth missing (living people)